Naizghi Kiflu (Ge'ez: ናየዝጊ ክፍሉ nāyʾizgī kiflū, Tigrinya "Of the Lord," "His part") was an adviser on Local Government Affairs to President Isaias Afewerki of Eritrea. He was living in London, England due to the dialysis he needs for his kidneys but eventually died of the disease. He came to England in 2005 with the intention of becoming an ambassador. His body was believed to be forbidden to enter Eritrea by President Isaias Afwerki, since he had a personality clash with him.

References

2012 deaths
Year of birth missing
People's Front for Democracy and Justice politicians